The 1918 Colorado Mines Orediggers football team was an American football team that represented the Colorado School of Mines in the Rocky Mountain Conference during the 1918 college football season. Under head coach Irving J. Barron, the team compiled a 4–0 record and won the conference championship.

Schedule

References

Colorado Mines
Colorado Mines Orediggers football seasons
Rocky Mountain Athletic Conference football champion seasons
College football undefeated seasons
Colorado Mines Orediggers football